Michael Lionel Howell (born July 5, 1943) is a former American football defensive back who played with the National Football League's Cleveland Browns and the Miami Dolphins. Howell was drafted by the Browns in the eighth round of the 1965 NFL Draft out of Grambling State.

A college quarterback, Howell converted to defensive back in the NFL. Howell felt he had no chance playing quarterback in the NFL due to his race. At the time African-Americans were stereotyped as not being able to successfully play the position. "I know I'm not going into the NFL as a black quarterback," is what Howell told his coach, the legendary Eddie Robinson. So, he changed to cornerback, winning a starting job in 1966, and moved to free safety in 1968. Howell did not miss a league game during his career in Cleveland, and intercepted 27 passes during his NFL career.

In 2012, the Cleveland Plain Dealer selected Howell as one of the 100 best players in Browns history.

References

1943 births
Living people
People from West Monroe, Louisiana
American football cornerbacks
American football safeties
Cleveland Browns players
Miami Dolphins players
Grambling State Tigers football players